Kevin Bakhurst (born December 1965) is a British journalist and media executive. He has been group director of content and media policy at the UK regulator Ofcom since October 2016. Previously, he was the managing director of news and current affairs and deputy director-general at the Irish national broadcaster RTÉ. He was formerly the controller of the British digital television news channel BBC News, a position he held from December 2005 until September 2012. He was also controller of the BBC News at One bulletin, and in May 2010 he became deputy head of the BBC Newsroom.

Bakhurst attended Haberdashers' Aske's School in Elstree and then St John's College, Cambridge where he read French and German. After a brief spell of working at Price Waterhouse he joined the BBC in 1989, first as a researcher and then as an assistant producer at the BBC Business and Economics Unit.

In 1990 he was promoted to producer of the BBC Nine O'Clock News, where he remained until he moved to Brussels in 1994 to gain further experience for BBC News. In 1996, after two years in Brussels, he returned to the UK to become the assistant editor on the BBC Nine O'Clock News, remaining with the program when it became the BBC Ten O'Clock News. From 2001 to 2003 he was an editor at the BBC News channel, and followed that by being named acting editor of the BBC Ten O'Clock News. He was then confirmed as the permanent editor of the program in March 2004. During his two years as editor of the BBC Ten O'Clock News it won two Baftas for its coverage of the Madrid Bombings and the 2005 London Tube bombings, and a Royal Television Society award for News Programme of The Year.

It was announced on 10 July 2012 that Bakhurst would be the new managing director of news and current affairs at the Irish national public service broadcaster RTÉ.

References

External links

1965 births
Alumni of St John's College, Cambridge
Living people
RTÉ executives
BBC executives
21st-century Irish journalists